William Dudley (1766 – May 5, 1813) was a colonel in the 13th Regiment of the Kentucky Militia during the War of 1812.

He was born in Fredericksburg, Virginia to Robert and Joyce (Gayle) Dudley. He married Lucy Smith on August 23, 1792.

Life in Kentucky
As a young man, William went to seek his fortune west of the Appalachian Mountains. He eventually settled in Fayette County, Kentucky. There, he served as the local magistrate for several years. When the War of 1812 broke out, he was a colonel in the 13th Regiment of Kentucky Militia.

Military service
In the spring of 1813, Dudley was under command of General Green Clay. Clay's forces numbered some 1,200 strong as they travelled up the Maumee River to Fort Meigs. Clay's forces arrived at the fort on May 4, 1813, in the midst of the Siege of Fort Meigs.

General William Henry Harrison sent a courier to General Clay ordering him to conduct a raid against the British battery on the other side of the Maumee to drive them away and spike (disable) their cannons and then immediately withdraw to the fort. General Clay left this raiding task up to Colonel Dudley and a force of 800 Kentucky militiamen.

On the morning of May 5, Dudley conducted his raid and assaulted the British battery, succeeding in driving them off. After this, however, Clay's plan fell apart. The soldier with the tools to spike the cannons had accidentally landed on the opposite side of the river. In desperation, Dudley's men tried with some success to spike the guns with their bayonets and ramrods. The 11 artillery guns were only temporarily disabled.

Meanwhile, the Indians became a problem when they opened fire on the Kentuckians from inside the woods. Determined to avenge the Kentuckians who had been slaughtered by the Indians after their capture in the River Raisin Massacre, the Kentuckians charged into the woods against their officers' orders. The Indians drew the militiamen further and further into the woods, where they were finally surrounded by the Indians and the British Army.

Forced to surrender, the Kentuckians were marched downriver to the ruins of Fort Miami. Soon, the Native Americans began firing at random into the prisoners, killing several of them. They then began tomahawking the prisoners and stealing their belongings. Several British officers, including Colonel Henry Procter, stood watching some distance away, but they made no attempt to stop the massacre. At least 30 prisoners were murdered before Tecumseh arrived himself. He immediately drew his tomahawk and stood between the prisoners and their attackers. The Indian leader called Procter a woman for being afraid to end the slaughter of the helpless prisoners. "You are unfit to command," he said."Go and put on petticoats!"

Of the 800 men who conducted the raid on the British artillery, about 650 were killed, wounded or captured. Only 150 men withdrew safely to Fort Meigs. Among the dead was Colonel Dudley, who was killed in the first few minutes of the fighting. The battle became known as "Dudley's Massacre" or "Dudley's Defeat."

The event is commemorated by an historical marker on the grounds of the Maumee Library, in Maumee, Ohio, not far the site of the encounter.

See also
 Fort Meigs
 Green Clay
 Siege of Fort Meigs
 William Henry Harrison

References

People from Fayette County, Kentucky
1766 births
1813 deaths
Military personnel from Fredericksburg, Virginia
American military personnel killed in the War of 1812
American militiamen in the War of 1812
American militia officers